Irene Awret or Irene Spicker (1921–2014) was a German artist, author and Holocaust survivor.

Biography

Awret née Spicker was born on January 30, 1921, in Berlin, Germany. She was the youngest of three children. In 1937, as a result of the Nuremberg Laws, Irene left high school and began studying drawing and painting. Around 1939 she and a sister fled to Belgium, where she stayed for several years. She continued her studies and eventually was able to find work restoring wooden sculptures.

In 1943 Awret was detained by the Gestapo in occupied Belgium and subsequently sent to the Mechelen transit camp. There she worked in the camp art workshop where she produced signs and armbands. She was also required to paint portraits of Nazi officers. In the camp she met Azriel Awret (1910-2011), fellow artist and prisoner. The two married in late 1944 after the liberation of Mechelen. 

The couple and their children emigrated to Safed, Israel in 1949. There they founded an art colony.

In the 1970s the couple moved to the United States. In 2004 Awret's memoir They'll Have to Catch Me First: An Artist's Coming of Age in the Third Reich was published by the University of Wisconsin Press. Awret died in Falls Church, Virginia on June 6, 2014.

Legacy
Awret's paintings are included in the collection of the Beit Lohamei Haghetaot (Ghetto Fighters' House Museum). More of the couple's art is located at the Kazerne Dossin: Memoriaal, Museum en Documentatiecentrum over Holocaust en Mensenrechten (Kazerne Dossin Memorial, Museum and Documentation Centre). Awret's 1939 passport is in the United States Holocaust Memorial Museum.

References

External links
images of Awret's work on Invaluable

1921 births
2014 deaths
Artists from Berlin
20th-century German women artists
20th-century German women writers
German emigrants to Israel
Jewish concentration camp survivors
Israeli emigrants to the United States